Invasion of Tulagi may refer to:

 Invasion of Tulagi (May 1942), the Japanese invasion of Tulagi in May 1942
 Battle of Tulagi and Gavutu–Tanambogo, the Allied liberation of Tulagi in August 1942

See also
 The Pacific War